József Vitéz Heszlényi (Heyszl; 24 July 1890, Igló, Szepes (county) – 2 June 1945) was a Hungarian General during World War II and commander of the 3rd Hungarian Army.

He graduated from the Imperial and Royal Technical Military Academy in 1911.

On May 8, 1945 Heszlényi, along with his son József Heszlényi Jr., who served on the staff of his father, were captured by American troops. Heszlényi was then handed over to the Soviets, where he committed suicide by cutting his wrists with a razor blade on June 2, 1945 in Zwettl, Austria. On June 19, 1945 a military tribunal posthumously demoted and dishonorably discharged Heszlényi from the Hungarian Army.

Military career
 Commanding Officer 23rd Infantry Brigade, November 1938 - 1 March 1940
 Commanding Officer 2nd Motorized Brigade, 1 March 1940 - 1 November 1940
 Deputy Chief of Supply Bureau, Ministry of Defense, 1 November 1940 - 1 May 1941
 Chief of Supply Bureau, Ministry of Defense (HM/III), 1 May 1941 - 1 May 1942
 Chief of Main Supply Bureau, Ministry of Defense, 1 May 1942 - December 1942
 G.O.C. IV. Army Corps, December 1942 - September 1944
 Acting Commander-in-Chief, 3rd Army

Awards
 Iron Cross (1939) 2nd and 1st Class
 Knight's Cross of the Iron Cross (28 October 1944)
 Order of Vitéz

References

 
 

1890 births
1945 suicides
People from Spišská Nová Ves
Hungarian military personnel of World War II
Hungarian people who died in prison custody
Suicides in the Soviet Union
Recipients of the Knight's Cross of the Iron Cross
People who committed suicide in prison custody
Prisoners who died in Soviet detention
Suicides by sharp instrument in Austria